The Centre de services scolaire de la Capitale is Francophone school service centre of Quebec City.

It opened in 1998. Previously Commission des écoles catholiques de Québec operated public Catholic schools of all languages; francophone ones were transferred to de la Capitale while Central Quebec School Board took the English ones.

Schools
Primary and Secondary:
 École régionale des Quatre-Saisons

Secondary: 
 École Boudreau
 École Cardinal-Roy
 École Jean-de-Brébeuf
 École Joseph-François-Perrault
 École L'Odyssée
 École Saint-Denys-Garneau
 École secondaire de la Cité
 École secondaire de Neufchâtel
 École secondaire La Camaradière
 École secondaire Roger-Comtois
 École secondaire Vanier

Primary:
École à l'Orée-des-Bois
École Alexander-Wolff
École Amédée-Boutin
École Anne-Hébert
École d'éducation internationale Notre-Dame-des-Neiges
École de Château-d'Eau
École de l'Accueil
École de l'Apprenti-Sage
École de l'Arc-en-Ciel
École de l'Aventure
École de l'Escabelle
Pavillons A-B-C
École de La Chanterelle
École de La Chaumière
École de la Grande-Hermine
École de la Mosaïque
École de la Myriade
École de la Source
École des Berges
École des Écrivains
École des Explorateurs
École des Jeunes-du-Monde
pavillon Bardy
pavillon Champfleury
École Dominique-Savio
École du Beau-Séjour
École du Buisson
École du Domaine
École du Joli-Bois
École du Val-Joli
École du Vignoble
École internationale de Saint-Sacrement
École Jacques-Cartier
École Jean-XXIII
École Jules-Émond
École L'Odyssée
École Les Prés-Verts
Main campus
Pavillon Saint-Bernard
École Marguerite-Bourgeoys
École Notre-Dame-du-Canada
École Sacré-Coeur
École Saint-Albert-le-Grand
École Saint-Claude
École Saint-Denys-Garneau
École Saint-Fidèle
École Saint-Jean-Baptiste
École Saint-Malo
École Saint-Paul-Apôtre
École Sainte-Monique
École Sainte-Odile
École Sans-Frontière

References

External links
 Centre de services scolaire de la Capitale 

School districts in Quebec
Education in Quebec City
1998 establishments in Quebec
Educational institutions established in 1998
Education in Capitale-Nationale